George Washington Ladoga (* 19 November 1994) is a Solomon Islands football player.

Career

Club 
Ladoga played for Three Kings United and for  Auckland United in the ASB Youth League.

International 
He was first nominated in March 2013 and made in this game, his first and only appearance for the Solomon Islands national football team. Ladoga played prior five games for the U-17 of Solomon Islands, in January 2011. In April 2015 was called to Solomon's U-23 team and played with the Solomon Islands national under-23 football team, the 2015 Pacific Games in Bisini, Papua New Guinea.

References

Living people
1994 births
Solomon Islands international footballers
Association football defenders
Solomon Islands footballers